Sandstone Point is a coastal locality in the Moreton Bay Region, Queensland, Australia.

Geography 
The locality is one of the fastest growing residential communities in the Moreton Bay Region. 

Sandstone Point has the following coastal features:

 Turners Camp Island, now connected to the mainland
 Toorbul Point
 Sandstone Point

 Godwin Beach, a beach which extends from neighbouring locality of Godwin Beach to the south-west

Off-shore are a number of marine waterbodies:

 Pumicestone Channel, to the west, separating Bribie Island from the mainland 
 Deception Bay to the south
 Moreton Bay, also known as Quandamook, to the south-east

History 
The town is built on the traditional lands of the Ningy Ningy people, whose presence was attested down to recent times by the ceremonial bora ring south of Bestman Road. Upwards of 2,000 Aboriginal people once gathered there for ritual purposes. 

Once known as Toorbul Point, the area was the site of an allied amphibious training base during World War II.

The median age of the Sandstone Point population was 51 years, 14 years above the national median of 37. 76.8% of people living in Sandstone Point were born in Australia. The other top responses for country of birth were England 7.6%, New Zealand 4.2%, Scotland 1%, Germany 0.7%, Netherlands 0.6%. 94.2% of people spoke only English at home; the next most common languages were 0.4% Dutch, 0.3% Afrikaans, 0.3% German, 0.3% Spanish, 0.2% French.

Education 
There are no schools in Sandstone Point. The nearest government primary and secondary schools are Bribie Island State School and Bribie Island State High School, both in Bongaree on Bribie Island across the bridge to the east.

Amenities 
The Village Sandstone Point is a shopping centre at  208 Bestmann Road East. Its anchor tenant is an IGA supermarket.

Sandstone Point Hotel is at 1800 Bribie Island Road.

Pebble Beach Retirement Community is a retirement village at 210-232 Bestmann Road East, immediately west of the shopping centre.

Spinnaker Sound Marina is a  marina. There is a boat ramp at the marina.

Kal Ma Kuta Drive boat ramp is north of the marina and provides access into the Pumicestone Passage. It is managed by the Moreton Bay Regional Council.

There are a number of parks in the area:

 Pebble Beach Common
 Spinnaker Park

References

External links 
 

Suburbs of Moreton Bay Region
Queensland in World War II
Localities in Queensland